Horse and Rider is a 2014 sculpture by American artist Charles Ray. As of June 2015, the equestrian self-portrait was installed in the Art Institute of Chicago's South McCormick Courtyard, in the U.S. state of Illinois. The work is part of "Charles Ray: Sculpture 1997–2014".

In 2019, Glenstone, a private museum located in Potomac, Maryland, began displaying Horse and Rider. Glenstone also exhibits several other works by Ray.

See also

 2014 in art
 Fountain of the Great Lakes
 List of public art in Chicago

References

2014 establishments in Illinois
2014 sculptures
Equestrian statues in Illinois
Outdoor sculptures in Chicago
Sculptures of men in Illinois
Self-portraits
Statues in Chicago